Rajendra Pratap Singh (born 20 October 1954), popularly known as Moti Singh, is an Indian politician affiliated to the Bhartiya Janata Party. He represents Patti assembly constituency of Pratapgarh district. He has been elected as the member of legislative assembly from the same constituency for three time in row. In his fourth attempt for re-election there were errors in counting, which was later cleared by the high court (Rajendra Pratap Singh aka Moti Singh vs Ram Singh and others, 9 August 2016) . The then MLA was removed and the seat was left vacant after the decision of High Court (Lucknow Bench). He won the 2017 elections from the same seat and became a Cabinet Minister in the 2017 Uttar Pradesh Cabinet. Previously, Shri. Singh served as Uttar Pradesh state Minister of Agriculture in 2003. He has been popularly known for his strong and clean image.
He has been appointed as a cabinet minister on 19 March 2017. Currently holding rural development department.

Personal life 
Singh born to father Bharat Singh on 20 October 1954 in Pratapgarh, Uttar Pradesh, India. He holds Bachelor of Science degree and studied law from Allahabad University. He is an agriculturalist, industrialist and businessman. He married Urmila Singh on 28 May 1973. They have three daughters and a son.

Political career 
Singh's political career was started in 1983 when he was elected as Block Pramukh (Block chief) from Mangraura for the first time, which created record of securing maximum votes in district Pratapgarh. In 1988, he re-elected in block Pramukh election. He became a member of Uttar Pradesh Legislative Council from Pratapgarh district in 1990.
Moti Singh is member of Uttar Pradesh Vidhan Sabha from 1996 to 2007, winning 1996, 2002, 2007 and 2017 elections. He has been appointed as a cabinet minister on 19 March 2017.

Rajendra alias Moti Singh contested Uttar Pradesh assembly election 1989 from Indian National Congress Party and unsuccessfully he lost and Janata Dal's candidate Ram Lakhan won by margin 35.44% votes. Moti claimed that he had not lost election 1989, due to some technical problem his votes were not counted properly, still case is pending in a court on the issue of assembly election 1989.

Moti Singh won a seat from a Bhartiya Janata Party ticket and elected as Member of Legislative assembly in 1996 from Patti, Uttar Pradesh. he re-elected as legislator from the same constituency in 2002. He was state minister of agriculture in 2003. Moti Singh won again in 2007 Assembly Election with 29.74% of votes gain for Bhartiya Janata Party in Patti, Uttar Pradesh constituency. He lost the 2012 Uttar Pradesh assembly elections and got 61,278 Votes which was later on, cleared up and he won the case from High Court Allahabad (Lucknow Bench). The then current MLA was removed and the seat was held empty. He won again in 2017 elections against Ram Singh of Samajvadi Party.

See also 

 Pratapgarh (Lok Sabha constituency)
 List of people from Pratapgarh

References

External links
 Uttar Pradesh Legislative Assembly Member Profile
 Rajendra Pratap Singh 
 https://indiankanoon.org/doc/129312597/

1954 births
Living people
People from Pratapgarh, Uttar Pradesh
Bharatiya Janata Party politicians from Uttar Pradesh
State cabinet ministers of Uttar Pradesh
Yogi ministry
Uttar Pradesh MLAs 2017–2022
Politicians from Lucknow